The presidents of the regional junta, from its proclamation in 1970 until today, were eight and have presided over a total of 14 members.

As established by the art. 114, second paragraph of the text, the region of Umbria was established, and the first regional elections took place on 7 June 1970. Until 1993 the presidents were elected by the regional council and following the 1995 reform, the election of the president of the region is by universal and direct suffrage.

The youngest president at the time of the elections was Pietro Conti, who took office at the age of 41; the oldest was Maria Rita Lorenzetti, who finished her term at the age of 57. Germano Marri was the president who presided over most, elected three times and with the longest mandate, with 10 years, 11 months and 6 days, while Francesco Ghirelli with the shorter mandate.

The Italian Communist Party is the party that has included most of the presidents (three), having governed from 1970 to 1992 with the Italian Socialist Party

The most durable junta was the first Marini junta, with 5 years, 2 months and 1 day, while the shorter one was the first Ghirelli junta.

List of presidents

Timeline

References

 
Politics of Umbria
Umbria